The National University of Bangladesh is a public university of Bangladesh that was established by an Act of Parliament as an affiliating University of the country to impart graduate and post-graduate level education to the students through its affiliated colleges and professional institutions throughout the country. It is the fourth largest university in the world according to enrollment. The headquarters is in Gazipur, on the outskirts of Dhaka.

Organization
It is a postgraduate teaching and research university as well as an affiliating university. It is state-run and public. The university has a school and a centre. It has established institutes that provide courses leading to MPhil and PhD degrees.

The Institute of Humanities and Social Sciences (IHS) was introduced in 1997 to offer two-year M.Phil. following modern American credit hour and semester system including course work, two-month internship and thesis guided by a supervisor. The M.Phil. is an interdisciplinary degree which is intensive enough to help the students to pursue PhD courses. The course is open to faculty members who are employed at universities and colleges.

Four more institutes – the Institute of Liberation and Bangladesh Studies (ILBS), Institute of National Science (INS), Institute of Life Sciences (ILS), and Institute of Business and Management Studies (IBMS) – have all the formalities complete toward their constitutions and are soon to provide higher courses related to science, needs of life, and national heritage.

Very few of the teachers teaching at honours and masters level have higher training. The training programme of the university is designed to augment the knowledge of the college teachers, enhance their skill in teaching and get them an exposure to higher ideas. Eminent educationists and scholars of the country are associated with the academic programmes provided on campus.

There are four academic units:
 School of Under Graduate Studies
 Centre for Post-Graduate Studies Training & Research
 M. Phil./Ph.D.Programme Unit
 Centre for Curriculum Development and Evaluation

The school and centres organise education in colleges and improve the standard. The university provides bachelor's, honours and master's degrees in ten disciplines: languages, humanities, social science, commerce and business administration, physical sciences, mathematical sciences, biological science, education, law and computer technology.

Apart from the units providing campus teaching at Board Bazar, Gazipur, the university has about 2,254 component/affiliated colleges. These colleges under its academic control cater for courses leading to Pass, Honours and master's degrees. The university exercises academic control over the colleges according to the National University Act 1992 mandated by the National Parliament of Bangladesh and the statutes of the university. It provides the curricula and syllabi, arranges admission test, gives guidelines for admission, arranges inspection, holds examination, publishes results, and awards certificates.

The National University of Bangladesh is now the fifth largest university in the world after its 17-year history by its number of registered students at affiliated colleges. It is also one of the largest universities in the world by number of affiliated colleges and number of expanding subjects and courses.

Academic departments 
 Faculty of Arts
 Department of Arabic
 Department of Bengali
 Department of English
 Department of Pali
 Department of Sanskrit
 Department of History
 Department of Islamic History & Culture
Department of Islamic Studies 
 Faculty of Business Studies
 Department of BBA (Professional)
 Department of Aviation Management
 Department of Library Management
 Department of Accounting
 Department of Finance & Banking
 Department of Management
 Department of Marketing
 Department of Tourism and Hospitality Management
 Faculty of Engineering (Professionals)
 Dept. of Aeronautical and Aviation Science and Engineering
 Dept. of Computer Science and Engineering
 Dept. of Electronics and Communication Engineering
Faculty of Life & Earth Science
Department of Psychology
Department of Zoology
Department of Geography & Environment Studies 
Department of Botany
 Faculty of Science
 Department of Computer Science
 Department of Chemistry
 Department of Physics
 Department of Mathematics
 Department of Statistics
 Faculty of Social Science
 Department of Law
 Department of Economics
 Department of Political science
 Department of Sociology
 Department of Social Work
 Department of Anthropology
 Department of Public Administration
 Department of Home Economics
 Department of Information science and Library Management
 Faculty of Technology (Professionals)
 Department of FDT
 Department of AMT
 Department of KMT

Vice-Chancellors
Full list of the vice-chancellors.
 Muhammad Abdul Bari (1992–1996)
 Aminul Islam (1996–2000)
 Durgadas Bhattacharjee (2000–2001)
 Abdul Momin Chowdhury (2001–2003)
 Aftab Ahmad (2003–2005)
 Wakil Ahmed (2005–2007)
 Syed Rashedul Hasan (in-charge;2007–2008)
 M Mofakhkharul Islam (2008–2009)
 Kazi Shahidullah (2009–2013)
 Harun-or-Rashid (2013–2021)
 Md. Moshiur Rahman (2021 - Present)

Research and publication 
 The National University Journal
 Publication "7 দফা'র 100 বছর"
 Newsletter
 Samachar
 Masters Regular Quata Admission Result

Prominent affiliated colleges 
There are around 2,254 colleges affiliated to NUB. Prominent ones include the following:

Alhaz Abdul Haque Chowdhury Degree College,Feni
Feni Government College,Feni
 Abudharr Gifari College
 AIICT- Ahsanullah Institute of Information & Communication Technology
 Bandarban Government College, Bandarban Chattogram
 Bangladesh Institute of Science and Technology (BIST)   
 Bara aulia degree college
 Brahmanbaria Government College
 Brajalal College
 Brojomohun College
 Carmichael College
 Charkalekhan Adarsha College
 Chittagong College
 Chandpur Government College
 College of Aviation & Technology, Uttara, Dhaka
 College of Business Science & Technology - CBST, Mymensingh
 Cox's Bazar City College, Cox's Bazar
 Cox's Bazar Govt. College
 Dhaka City College
 Dhaka Commerce College
 Dhaka Dakshin Government College
 Daffodil Institute of IT (DIIT)
 Daffodil Institute of Science and Technology (DIST)
 Dinajpur Government College
 Edward College, Pabna
 Feni Government College
 Gachbariya Government College, Chandanish, Chittagong
 Gobindoganj Govt. College, Gaibandha
 Government Azizul Haque College, Bogra
 Government City College, Chittagong
 Government Commerce College Chittagong
 Government Hazi Mohammad Mohshin College
 Government Ispahani College, Keraniganj, Dhaka.
 Government Padma College, Dohar, Dhaka
 Government Physical Education College, Dhaka
 Government Saadat College, Tangail
 Government Shahid Sohrawardi College
 Government Sheikh Fazilatunnesa Mujib Mohila College, Tangail
 Govt. Sundarban Adarsha College, Khulna
 Government Tolaram College
 Government Syed Hatem Ali College
 Gunabati Degree College
 Habibullah Bahar College
 Haji Jamir Uddin Shafina Women's College
 Institute of Global Management and Information System (IGMIS), Chattogram
 Institute of Science, Trade and Technology (ISTT)
 Islamia University College, Chittagong
 IST-Institute of Science and Technology
 Jahangirpur Govt. College
 Jeshore govt. City college
 Joypurhat Govt. College
 Khilgaon Model College
 Kumudini Women's College, Tangail
 Lalmatia Mohila College, Dhaka
 Madan Mohan College, Sylhet
 Maheshpur degree college
 Marine Fisheries Academy, Chittagong
 Maulana Mohammad Ali College
 Michael Modhushudon College
 Mirpur College
 MIST- Model Institute of Science and Technology
 Moulvibazar Govt. College, Maulvibazar - Edu Icon (36)
 Murapara University College
 Murari Chand College, Sylhet
 Najiur Rahman Collage Bhola
 Narsingdi Government College
 Nawabganj Government College
 New Government Degree College, Rajshahi
 Omar Gani M.E.S. College
 Pakundia Adarsha Mohila College
 Patuakhali Government College, Patuakhali, Barishal
 Rajshahi College
 Rajshahi Government City College, Rajshahi
 Rangpur Government College
 Rayermohal Mohabidyalay, Rayermohal, Khulna
 Sapahar Government College
 Shaikh Burhanuddin Post Graduate College
 Sylhet Government Women's College
 Tejgaon College
 Tongi Government College
 Victoria College, Comilla
 Victoria College, Narail
 Roverpolli College, Gazipur

References

 
Public universities of Bangladesh
Educational institutions established in 1992
1992 establishments in Bangladesh
Organisations based in Gazipur
Universities and colleges in Gazipur District